Laugarbakki is a village in Iceland located on the east road of the Miðfjarðará river, with a population of around 57 inhabitants in 2018.

References 

Populated places in Iceland
Pages using the Kartographer extension
Coordinates on Wikidata